The 2014 Nobel Peace Prize was shared, in two equal parts, between Kailash Satyarthi (b. 1954) and Malala Yousafzai (b. 1997) "for their struggle against the suppression of children and young people and for the right of all children to education".
Satyarthi is from India, the seventh person from his country to win a Nobel Prize and the second to win the Peace Prize after Mother Teresa, while Yousafzai is a Muslim from Pakistan, the second Nobel Prize winner from her country after Abdus Salam, the forty-seventh woman to win the Nobel Prize, and at the age of 17 years, the youngest winner of a Nobel Prize in any field.

Motivation 
In a press release, the Committee indicated that it had chosen the combination of a Hindu and a Muslim, and of an Indian and a Pakistani, on purpose, because they "join in a common struggle for education and against extremism". They stressed that "fraternity between nations" was one of the original criteria stipulated by Alfred Nobel.

The usage of child labour and discrimination against female education was the citation for the award. As of 2014 it is reckoned 168 million children are used for child labour, 60 million in India alone. This was mentioned by Thorbjørn Jagland in his handover ceremony speech.

Nominations 
The Nobel Prize Committee announced that it had received a record number of 278 different nominations for the Peace Prize, up from 259 in 2013. 47 of these nominations were for organizations.

Favourites 
Prior to the announcement, many news media speculated about who would win this year, providing lists of favourites. Often cited were Pope Francis, Ban Ki-moon, Chelsea Manning, Denis Mukwege, Edward Snowden, José Mujica, the Novaya Gazeta newspaper, and the so-called Japanese people who conserve Article 9, together with the eventual winner Malala Yousafzai. The other winner, Kailash Satyarthi, was not among the commonly cited favourites.

See also 

 Child labour 
 Child labour in India
 Child labour in Pakistan
 Education in Pakistan
 List of female Nobel laureates
 List of Muslim Nobel laureates
 Nobel laureates of India
 Nobel Peace Prize Concert § 2014
 Terrorism in Pakistan

References 

Nobel Peace Prize
Nobel Peace Prize
2014
Malala Yousafzai
October 2014 events in Europe